The ryotwari system was a land revenue system in British India introduced by Thomas Munro, which allowed the government to deal directly with the cultivator ('ryot') for revenue collection and gave the peasant freedom to cede or acquire new land for cultivation.

Description 
This system was in operation for nearly 5 years and had many features of revenue system of the Mughals. It was instituted in some parts of India,  one of the three main systems used to collect revenues from the cultivators of agricultural land. These taxes included un differentiated land revenue and rents, collected simultaneously. Where the land revenue was imposed directly on the [ryots] (the individual cultivators who actually worked the land) the system of assessment was known as ryotwari. Where the land revenue was imposed indirectly through agreements made with [Zamindars] the system of assessment was known as zamindari. In Bombay, Madras, Assam and Burma the Zamindar usually did not have a position as a middleman between the government and the farmer.

An official report by John Stuart Mill, who was working for the East India Company in 1857, explained the Ryotwari land tenure system as follows:
 

This took place in the Madras presidency and later extended to Bombay presidency

History 
The Ryotwari system is associated with the name of  Thomas Munro, who was appointed Governor of Madras in May 1820. Subsequently, the Ryotwari system was extended to the Bombay area. Munro gradually reduced the rate of taxation from one half to one third of the gross produce, even then an excessive tax.

In Northern India,  Edward Colebrooke and successive Governors-General had implored the Court of Directors of the East India Company, in vain, to redeem the pledge given by the British government, and to permanently settle the land-tax, so as to make it possible for the people to accumulate wealth and improve their own condition.

Payment of the land tax in cash, rather than in kind, was instituted in the late 18th century when the East India Company wanted to establish an exclusive monopoly in the market as buyers of Indian goods. The requirement of cash payments frequently proved economically untenable for cultivators, exposing them to the exorbitant demands of moneylenders when crops failed.

Dissimilar to permanent settlement in the British territories in the south, a new system that was devised came to be known as the ryotwari.
It was tried on a small scale by Alexander Read in some areas that were taken over by the company after the war with the Tipu Sultan.

In Bengal and Northern India the zamindari system was as follows
 To collect tax from a land, the British had zamindars bid for the highest tax rates; i.e., zamindars quoted a tax rate that they promised to obtain from a particular land.
 The highest bidder was made the owner of the land from which they collected the taxes.
 The farmers and cultivators who owned the land lost their ownership and became tenants in their own land.
 They were to pay the landlords/zamindars the tax for the land only in the form of cash and not in kind.
 If a zamindar was not able to collect the quoted amount of tax, he lost the ownership.

By comparison, this is the way taxes had been collected by the king 

 The tax could be paid either in cash or in kind.
 Payments in kind were mostly in the form of land which was given to the king.
 The king never made use of those lands, which could be bought back by the farmers after they got back some money.
 The farmer owned his land.
 Tax rates were reduced in case of a famine, bad weather or other serious event.

The differences are these 
 Since the farmer had to pay only in cash under the new system, he could only sell it to a fellow farmer who started using the land for cultivation of a different crop and therefore was not willing to return it.
 The farmer eventually lost some part of his land to someone else and consequently retained a highly awkward remnant of land for cultivation.
 This led to excessive marketing of land, which lost its sentimental grip on the farmer. The land became merely a commodity.

Also because of the political scheme of Subsidiary Alliances, the pressure on agricultural land made things worse. It led to a failure of administration, leaving the blame on the feudatory king of the province; which allowed the East India Company to easily take over the administration.

See also
 Land tenure

References

Bibliography
 
 
  
 
 
 

Economic history of India